This is a list of bacteria that have been identified as promoting or causing:
 Uncontrolled growth of tissue in the body
 Cancer
 Carcinomas
 Tumors (including benign or slow growing)
 Neoplasms
 Sarcomas
 Precancerous lesions
 Coinfectious agent promoting the above growths

Species or genera

See also 
 Carcinogenic bacteria
 Sexually transmitted disease
 Infectious causes of cancer
 Infections associated with diseases
 List of infectious diseases
 Timeline of peptic ulcer disease and Helicobacter pylori - featured list

References

Further reading 

Cornwall, Claudia. Catching cancer : the quest for its viral and bacterial causes. Rowman & Littlefield Publishers (2013) Lanham, Maryland. .

Bacteriology
Infectious causes of cancer
Oncogenic
Infectious disease-related lists